The 1986 Trofeo Silk Cut was the sixth round of the 1986 World Sports-Prototype Championship, although it did not count towards the Teams' Championship.  It took place at Circuito Permanente de Jerez, Spain on August 3, 1986, marking the first time that the World Championship featured an event in Spain.

Official results
Class winners in bold.  Cars failing to complete 75% of the winner's distance marked as Not Classified (NC).

Statistics
 Pole Position - #17 Brun Motorsport - 1:33.480
 Fastest Lap - #18 Brun Motorsport - 1:38.090
 Average Speed - 147.270 km/h

References

 

Jerez
Jerez